Habab Al Hantash is a sub-district located in Khwlan District, Sana'a Governorate, Yemen. Habab Al Hantash had a population of 2526 according to the 2004 census.

References 

Sub-districts in Khwlan District